The 2017–18 Saint Joseph's Hawks basketball team represented Saint Joseph's University during the 2017–18 NCAA Division I men's basketball season. The Hawks, led by 23rd-year head coach Phil Martelli, played their home games at Hagan Arena in Philadelphia, Pennsylvania as members of the Atlantic 10 Conference. The Hawks finished the season 16–16, 10–8 in A-10 play to finish in fourth place. The defeated George Mason in the quarterfinals of the A-10 tournament before losing to Rhode Island in the semifinals.

Previous season
The Hawks finished the 2016–17 season 11–20, 4–14 A-10 play to finish in a tie for 12th place. As the No. 13 seed in the A-10 tournament, they lost to Massachusetts in the first round.

Offseason

Departures

2017 recruiting class

2018 recruiting class

Preseason 
In a poll of the league's head coaches and select media members at the conference's media day, the Hawks were picked to finish in third place in the A-10. Senior guard Shavar Newkirk was named to the conference's preseason second team.

Roster

Schedule and results

|-
!colspan=9 style=| Regular season

|-
!colspan=9 style=| Atlantic 10 tournament

Source

References

Saint Joseph's Hawks men's basketball seasons
Saint Joseph's
Saint Joseph's
Saint Joseph's